Cherie Ann Burton (born 13 November 1968) is a former Australian politician, who was a Labor member of the New South Wales Legislative Assembly for Kogarah from 1999 to 2015.

Biography 
Burton was born in Paddington, New South Wales and brought up in Minto. She graduated from Narrabeen High School in 1986 and became an accounts clerk and an official for the National Union of Workers.  She later became an adviser to Premier Bob Carr.

Political life 
Burton has been the member for the relatively safe Labor seat of Kogarah since 1999 when she defeated the Liberal candidate, Sam Witheridge after being installed by the head office administrative committee as the Labor candidate on an N40 ruling, bypassing local pre-selection. At the time of her election, aged 30, she was one of the youngest Labor politicians on the back bench, second only to Matt Brown, aged 27.

Burton was the Minister for Housing and the Minister Assisting the Minister for Health (Mental Health) from August 2005 to March 2007. Citing family reasons, Burton announced she had decided to step down from the ministry following the 2007 NSW election. However questions were raised as to whether she was forced to give up her place in the ministry due to a police enquiry into an alleged assault against the nephew of the Liberal candidate for Burton's electorate on polling day.

Burton's political career was defined by her relentless pursuit for the disadvantaged and her progressive reforming legacy to public representation.

Outside politics 
Burton is a keen sailor, having sailed since her teens. She is a Patron of the Kogarah Bay Sailing Club. In October 2006 she opened a new pontoon for Sailability Kogarah Bay at Dover Park, Blakehurst.

Burton announced she met her husband, Andrew Murphy, after consulting television psychic John Holland in early 2003.

References 

 

1968 births
Australian Labor Party members of the Parliament of New South Wales
Living people
Members of the New South Wales Legislative Assembly
Politicians from Sydney
21st-century Australian politicians
Women members of the New South Wales Legislative Assembly
21st-century Australian women politicians